Moyie Springs is a city in Boundary County, Idaho, United States. The population was 718 at the 2010 census.

Geography
Moyie Springs is located at  (48.724599, -116.193585).

Moyie Springs is located near the confluence of the Moyie and Kootenai rivers.

Demographics

2010 census
At the 2020 census, there were 718 people, 270 households and 190 families residing in the city. The racial make-up of the city was 93.6% White, 0.8% African American, 0.7% Native American, 0.1% Asian, 1.7% from other races, and 3.1% from two or more races. Hispanic or Latino of any race were 7.7% of the population.

There were 270 households, of which 41.5% had children under the age of 18 living with them, 51.1% were married couples living together, 11.1% had a female householder with no husband present, 8.1% had a male householder with no wife present, and 29.6% were non-families. 24.1% of all households were made up of individuals, and 8.9% had someone living alone who was 65 years of age or older. The average household size was 2.66 and the average family size was 3.12.

The median age was 32.3 years. 31.8% of residents were under the age of 18; 6.5% were between the ages of 18 and 24; 26.8% were from 25 to 44; 24.1% were from 45 to 64; and 10.6% were 65 years of age or older. The gender make-up was 48.6% male and 51.4% female.

2000 census
At the 2000 census, there were 656 people, 240 households and 177 families residing in the city. The racial make-up was 98.02% White, 0.76% Native American, 0.15% Asian, 0.61% from other races, and 0.46% from two or more races. Hispanic or Latino of any race were 2.44% of the population.

There were 240 households, of which 38.3% had children under the age of 18 living with them, 60.8% were married couples living together, 9.6% had a female householder with no husband present, and 26.3% were non-families. 18.3% of all households were made up of individuals, and 5.0% had someone living alone who was 65 years of age or older.  The average household size was 2.73 and the average family size was 3.14.

32.8% of the population were under the age of 18, 6.9% from 18 to 24, 27.9% from 25 to 44, 20.7% from 45 to 64, and 11.7% who were 65 years of age or older. The median age was 32 years. For every 100 females, there were 88.0 males. For every 100 females age 18 and over, there were 90.9 males.

The median household income was $35,781 and the median family income was $36,042. Males had a median income of $32,788 and females $30,500. The per capita income was $15,516.  About 13.6% of families and 17.6% of the population were below the poverty line, including 21.9% of those under age 18 and 6.1% of those age 65 or over.

Politics

See also
 List of cities in Idaho

References

External links

Cities in Boundary County, Idaho
Cities in Idaho